Khurain (also Romanized as Khūrā’īn and Khowrā‘īn; also known as Khvor'īn and Qal‘eh Khvor’īn) is a village in Kahrizak Rural District, Kahrizak District, Ray County, Tehran Province, Iran. At the 2006 census, its population was 26, in 5 families.

References 

Populated places in Ray County, Iran